There are 102 mammal species in Italy, of which one is critically endangered, two are endangered, nine are vulnerable, and four are near threatened. One of the species listed for Italy is considered to be extinct.
The following tags are used to highlight each species' IUCN Red List status as published by the International Union for Conservation of Nature:

Order: Rodentia (rodents)

Rodents make up the largest order of mammals, with over 40% of mammalian species. They have two incisors in the upper and lower jaw which grow continually and must be kept short by gnawing.
Suborder: Hystricognathi
Family: Hystricidae (Old World porcupines)
Genus: Hystrix
Crested porcupine, H. cristata 
Suborder: Sciurognathi
Family: Sciuridae (squirrels)
Subfamily: Sciurinae
Tribe: Sciurini
Genus: Sciurus
Calabrian black squirrel, S. meridionalis  
Red squirrel, S. vulgaris 
Subfamily: Xerinae
Tribe: Marmotini
Genus: Marmota
 Alpine marmot, M. marmota 
Family: Gliridae (dormice)
Subfamily: Leithiinae
Genus: Dryomys
 Forest dormouse, D. nitedula 
Genus: Eliomys
Garden dormouse, E. quercinus 
Genus: Muscardinus
 Hazel dormouse, M. avellanarius 
Subfamily: Glirinae
Genus: Glis
 European edible dormouse, Glis glis 
Family: Cricetidae
Subfamily: Arvicolinae
Genus: Arvicola
European water vole, A. amphibius 
Genus: Chionomys
 Snow vole, Chionomys nivalis 
Genus: Clethrionomys
 Bank vole, Clethrionomys glareolus 
Genus: Microtus
 Field vole, Microtus agrestis 
 Common vole, Microtus arvalis 
 Calabria pine vole, Microtus brachycercus 
 Alpine pine vole, Microtus multiplex 
 Savi's pine vole, Microtus savii 
 European pine vole, Microtus subterraneus 
Family: Muridae (mice, rats, voles, gerbils, hamsters, etc.)
Subfamily: Murinae
Genus: Mus
House mouse, M. musculus 
Genus: Apodemus
 Alpine field mouse, Apodemus alpicola 
 Yellow-necked mouse, Apodemus flavicollis 
 Wood mouse, Apodemus sylvaticus 
Genus: Micromys
 Eurasian harvest mouse, Micromys minutus 
Genus: Rattus
Brown rat, R. norvegicus  introduced
Black rat, R. rattus  introduced

Order: Lagomorpha (lagomorphs)

The lagomorphs comprise two families, Leporidae (hares and rabbits), and Ochotonidae (pikas). Though they can resemble rodents, and were classified as a superfamily in that order until the early 20th century, they have since been considered a separate order. They differ from rodents in a number of physical characteristics, such as having four incisors in the upper jaw rather than two.
Family: Leporidae (rabbits, hares)
Genus: Lepus
Cape hare, L. capensis 
Corsican hare, L. corsicanus 
European hare, L. europaeus 
Mountain hare, L. timidus 
Genus: Oryctolagus
European rabbit, O. cuniculus  introduced
Family: Ochotonidae (pikas)
Genus: Prolagus
Sardinian pika, P. sardus

Order: Eulipotyphla (shrews, hedgehogs, gymnures, moles and solenodons)

Eulipotyphlans are insectivorous mammals. Shrews and solenodons resemble mice, hedgehogs carry spines, gymnures look more like large rats, while moles are stout-bodied burrowers. 
Family: Erinaceidae (hedgehogs and gymnures)
Subfamily: Erinaceinae
Genus: Erinaceus
 West European hedgehog, E. europaeus 

Family: Soricidae (shrews)
Subfamily: Crocidurinae
Genus: Crocidura
 Pantellerian shrew, Crocidura cossyrensis 
 Bicolored shrew, Crocidura leucodon 
 Sicilian shrew, Crocidura sicula 
Lesser white-toothed shrew, C. suaveolens 
Genus: Suncus
 Etruscan shrew, Suncus etruscus 
Subfamily: Soricinae
Tribe: Nectogalini
Genus: Neomys
 Southern water shrew, Neomys anomalus 
 Eurasian water shrew, Neomys fodiens 
Tribe: Soricini
Genus: Sorex
 Alpine shrew, Sorex alpinus 
 Common shrew, Sorex araneus 
 Eurasian pygmy shrew, Sorex minutus 
 Apennine shrew, Sorex samniticus 
Family: Talpidae (moles)
Subfamily: Talpinae
Tribe: Talpini
Genus: Talpa
 European mole, Talpa europaea 
 Mediterranean mole, Talpa caeca 
 Roman mole, Talpa romana

Order: Chiroptera (bats)

The bats' most distinguishing feature is that their forelimbs are developed as wings, making them the only mammals capable of flight. Bat species account for about 20% of all mammals.
Family: Vespertilionidae
Subfamily: Myotinae
Genus: Myotis
 Bechstein's bat, M. bechsteini 
 Lesser mouse-eared bat, M. blythii 
Brandt's bat, M. brandti 
 Long-fingered bat, M. capaccinii 
 Cryptic myotis, M. crypticus
Daubenton's bat, M. daubentonii  
Geoffroy's bat, M. emarginatus 
 Greater mouse-eared bat, M. myotis 
Whiskered bat, M. mystacinus 
Natterer's bat, M. nattereri 
Subfamily: Vespertilioninae
Genus: Barbastella
Western barbastelle, B. barbastellus 
Genus: Eptesicus
 Northern bat, E. nilssoni 
 Serotine bat, E. serotinus 
Genus: Hypsugo
Savi's pipistrelle, H. savii 
Genus: Nyctalus
Greater noctule bat, N. lasiopterus 
Lesser noctule, N. leisleri 
Common noctule, N. noctula 
Genus: Pipistrellus'''
Kuhl's pipistrelle, P. kuhlii 
Nathusius' pipistrelle, P. nathusii 
Common pipistrelle, P. pipistrellus 
Genus: PlecotusBrown long-eared bat, P. auritus 
Grey long-eared bat, P. austriacus 
Genus: VespertilioParti-coloured bat, V. murinus 
Subfamily: Miniopterinae
Genus: MiniopterusCommon bent-wing bat, M. schreibersii 
Family: Molossidae
Genus: TadaridaEuropean free-tailed bat, T. teniotis 
Family: Rhinolophidae
Subfamily: Rhinolophinae
Genus: RhinolophusMediterranean horseshoe bat, R. euryale 
Greater horseshoe bat, R. ferrumequinum 
Lesser horseshoe bat, R. hipposideros 
Mehely's horseshoe bat, R. mehelyi 

Order: Cetacea (whales)

The order Cetacea includes whales, dolphins and porpoises. They are the mammals most fully adapted to aquatic life with a spindle-shaped nearly hairless body, protected by a thick layer of blubber, and forelimbs and tail modified to provide propulsion underwater.
Suborder: Mysticeti
Family: Balaenidae (right whales)
Genus: Eubalaena North Atlantic right whale, E. glacialis 
Family: Balaenopteridae (rorquals)
Subfamily: Megapterinae
Genus: Megaptera Humpback whale, M. novaeangliae 
Subfamily: Balaenopterinae
Genus: Balaenoptera Fin whale, Balaenoptera physalus 
 Common minke whale, Balaenoptera acutorostrata 
Suborder: Odontoceti
Family: Physeteridae
Genus: Physeter Sperm whale, Physeter macrocephalus 
Superfamily: Platanistoidea
Family: Ziphidae
Genus: Ziphius Cuvier's beaked whale, Ziphius cavirostris  
Genus: Mesoplodon Sowerby's beaked whale, Mesoplodon bidens  Frenata la speculazione energetica nel Mar di Sardegna?
 Gervais' beaked whale, Mesoplodon europaeus  vagrant
Family: Delphinidae (marine dolphins)
Genus: Steno Rough-toothed dolphin, Steno bredanensis 
Genus: Tursiops Common bottlenose dolphin, Tursiops truncatus 
Genus: Stenella Striped dolphin, Stenella coeruleoalba 
Genus: Delphinus Short-beaked common dolphin, Delphinus delphis 
Genus: Grampus Risso's dolphin, Grampus griseus 
Genus: Feresa Pygmy killer whale, Feresa attenuata 
Genus: Pseudorca False killer whale, Pseudorca crassidens 
Genus: Orcinus Orca, O. orca 
Genus: Globicephala Long-finned pilot whale, G. melas 

Order: Carnivora (carnivorans)

There are over 260 species of carnivorans, the majority of which eat meat as their primary dietary item. They have a characteristic skull shape and dentition.
Suborder: Feliformia
Family: Felidae (cats)
Subfamily: Felinae
Genus: FelisAfrican wildcat, F. lybica 
European wildcat, F. silvestris 
Genus: LynxEurasian lynx, L. lynx 
Family: Viverridae (civets, mongooses, etc.)
Subfamily: Viverrinae
Genus: GenettaCommon genet, G. genetta  vagrant
Suborder: Caniformia
Family: Canidae (dogs, foxes)
Genus: VulpesRed fox, V. vulpes 
Genus: CanisGolden jackal, C. aureus  vagrant
European jackal, C. a. moreoticusGray wolf, C. lupus 
 Sicilian wolf, C. l. cristaldii 
 Italian wolf, C. l. italicusFamily: Ursidae (bears)
Genus: UrsusBrown bear, U. arctos 
 Marsican brown bear, U. a. marsicanus/arctos 
Family: Mustelidae (mustelids)
Genus: LutraEuropean otter, L. lutra 
Genus: MartesBeech marten, M. foina 
European pine marten, M. martes 
Genus: MelesEuropean badger, M. meles 
Genus: MustelaStoat, M. erminea 
Least weasel, M. nivalis 
European polecat, M. putorius 
Genus: NeogaleAmerican mink, N. vison  introduced
Family: Phocidae (earless seals)
Genus: MonachusMediterranean monk seal, M. monachus  possibly extirpated

Order: Artiodactyla (even-toed ungulates)

The even-toed ungulates are ungulates whose weight is borne about equally by the third and fourth toes, rather than mostly or entirely by the third as in perissodactyls. There are about 220 artiodactyl species, including many that are of great economic importance to humans.
Family: Bovidae (cattle, antelope, sheep, goats)
Subfamily: Caprinae
Genus: Capra Alpine ibex, C. ibex 
Genus: RupicapraPyrenean chamois, R. pyrenaica 
Chamois, R. rupicapraFamily: Cervidae (deer)
Subfamily: Cervinae
Genus: CervusWapiti, C. canadensis  introduced
Red deer, C. elaphus 
Sardinian deer, C. e. corsicanusGenus: DamaEuropean fallow deer, D. dama 
Subfamily: Capreolinae
Genus: CapreolusRoe deer, C. capreolus 
Family: Suidae (pigs)
Subfamily: Suinae
Genus: SusWild boar, S. scrofa 

 Locally extinct 
The following species are locally extinct in the country:
Blasius's horseshoe bat, Rhinolophus blasii''

See also
Fauna of Italy
List of chordate orders
Lists of mammals by region
Mammal classification

References

External links

Italy
Mammals
Mammals
Italy